Go Marching (1965 – August 10, 1994) was an American Thoroughbred racehorse who was sired by the outstanding Champion sire Princequillo and out of the Champion racemare, Leallah. Bred by Charlton Clay at his Marchmont Farm near Paris, Kentucky, Go Marching was sold to Warner L. Jones Jr. as an unnamed two-year-old colt in a May 1967 Fasig-Tipton sale at Belmont Park for a record price of $210,000.

Race career
Trained by U.S. Racing Hall of Fame inductee, Horatio Luro, at age three Go Marching won the first race of his career on March 7, 1968, at Florida's  Gulfstream Park when he ran on turf for the first time. He went on to win the Bernard Baruch Handicap at Saratoga Race Course in Saratoga Springs, New York and then had his best year at age four in 1969 when his wins included the Canadian Turf Handicap and the Appleton Handicap at Gulfstream Park.

Breeding career
Go Marching stood for his owner in Kentucky until age eleven. He was then sent to a breeding farm in France where he remained until age fourteen after which he was purchased by breeders who brought him to stand in  Japan where he died on August 10, 1994. Overall, Go Marching met with modest success as a sire.

Pedigree

References

1965 racehorse births
1994 racehorse deaths
Racehorses bred in Kentucky
Racehorses trained in the United States
Thoroughbred family 16-g